Ray Truant (October 10, 1930 – October 15, 2018) was a Canadian football player who played for the Hamilton Tiger-Cats. He won the Grey Cup with them in 1953 and 1957. Born in Detroit, Michigan and raised in Windsor, Ontario, he previously attended and played football at the University of Western Ontario and Kennedy Collegiate Institute in his hometown. Truant is a member of the Windsor/Essex County Sports Hall of Fame, Brantford Sports Hall of Fame, and the University of Western Ontario Sports Hall of Fame.

References

1930 births
Sportspeople from Detroit
Sportspeople from Windsor, Ontario
Players of Canadian football from Ontario
Hamilton Tiger-Cats players
2018 deaths
Western Mustangs football players